The maram is a membranophone percussion instrument from South India. It consists in a wood cylinder with two skin heads on each side, which are tensioned with skin laces, resembling a rustic mridangam. It is played with hands with the drum in a horizontal position and used in folk and temple music. Maram signifies 'trees' in South Indian languages.

The Valia paani maram is a sacred instrument used only for rites in temples. It is made up of the heart wood of jack wood, taken from the tree standing at the temple complex. On either side, it is covered with pieces of tanned leather of cow or bull-calf. Two hooks are provided on either side for tying a cloth so that the instrument rests either on the shoulder or wrist of the artist while beating it. It is beaten with palms. Before beating the drum it is essential that the player should change the cloth of the paani and have an unbleached new cloth. The leather on either side has to be rubbed with the paste of fresh boiled rice for smoothness.

See also
Dholak
Madal
Pakhawaj
Mridangam

References
 Vadakkan and Thekkan Pattukal.(Malayalam).(Sri Rama Vilasom Press, 1967), Pages 128 - 148.

External links
Video - Maram in temple ritual
Video - Maram in Pattukal songs
Video - Maram in folk music

Hand drums
Indian musical instruments
Asian percussion instruments